Guillem Burniol-Teixido (born 14 August 1983) is a Spanish former professional tennis player.

Burniol, a native of Barcelona, had a career high singles ranking of 383 in the world and won four ITF Futures titles during his career. He made two ATP Tour singles main draw appearances at the Valencia Open.

ITF Futures titles

Singles: (4)

Doubles: (3)

References

External links
 
 

1983 births
Living people
Spanish male tennis players
Tennis players from Barcelona